Milton Raison (1903-1982) was an American screenwriter for both film and television. He was also known as George Milton, George Wallace Sayre, and George Sayre.  His first credit was Air Hostess in 1933, which he co-wrote with Keene Thompson.   Over the next 20 years he would write the screenplay, story, or both on over 70 films.  With the advent of television, he also worked on several TV shows during the 1950s.

His credits during the 1930s include Strictly Dynamite (1934), The Shadow (1937), Torture Ship (1939), and The Man They Could Not Hang (1939).  His 1940s credits include Tumbledown Ranch in Arizona (1941), Sheriff of Sage Valley (1942), Anna May Wong's last starring role in 1943's Lady from Chungking, The Contender (1944), Alaska (1944), Forever Yours (1945), the 1945 Charlie Chan film, The Shanghai Cobra, and Rocky (1948). In the 1950s he penned A Modern Marriage (1950), Southside 1-1000, Topeka (1953), The Homesteaders, and his final film credit, 1953's Old Overland Trail.  In 1962 he received a story credit when A Modern Marriage was re-made as Frigid Wife.

His first television credit was in 1952, when he wrote an episode of Boston Blackie.  Other television credits include The Adventures of Kit Carson, The Roy Rogers Show, and The Millionaire.  His final credit was in 1960 on The Texan.

Filmography

(Per AFI database)

Big Time or Bust (1933) - screenplay
Reform Girl (1933) - adaptation
Air Hostess (1933) - screenplay
Strictly Dynamite (1934) - additional dialogue
The Code of the Mounted (1935) - story, adaptation
Racing Luck (1935) - story, screenplay
Song of the Trail (1936) - screenplay
Go-Get-'Em-Haines (1936) - original story, adaptation
Flying Hostess (1936) - original story
Country Gentlemen (1936) - story
The Shadow (1937) - story
Mis Dos Amore (1938) - screenplay
Torture Ship (1939) - screenplay
The Man They Could Not Hang (1939) - story
Girl from Rio (1939) - original screenplay
Undercover Agent (1939) - screenplay
Am I Guilty? (1940) - adaptation
West of Carson (1940) - screenplay
Murder on the Yukon (1940) - screenplay
Double Cross (1941) - screenplay
Tumbledown Ranch in Arizona (1941) - original story
Sheriff of Sage Valley (1942) - original screenplay
Secrets of a Co-Ed (1942) - original screenplay
Billy the Kid's Smoking Guns (1942) - original screenplay
Rolling Down the Great Divide (1942) - original screenplay
Jungle Siren (1942) - original story
Unseen Enemy (1942) - concept
Bombs Over Burma (1942) - original screenplay
Lady from Chungking (1942) - original story
Queen of Broadway (1943) - original story
Wings Over the Pacific (1943) - original screenplay
Nearly Eighteen (1943) - screenplay
The Renegades (1943) - original story
Fugitive of the Plains (1943) - original screenplay
Where Are Your Children? (1943) - screenplay
The Sultan's Daughter (1944) - original screenplay
The Contender (1944) - original story
Wild Horse Phantom (1944) - original story, screenplay
Alaska (1944) - screenplay
His Brother's Ghost (1945) - story, screenplay
Black Market Babies (1945) - screenplay
Border Badmen (1945) - story, screenplay
Forever Yours (1945) - original screenplay
The Shanghai Cobra (1945) - screenplay
High Powered (1945) - screenplay
The Phantom of 42nd Street (1945) - screenplay
Secrets of a Sorority Girl (1946) - original story
Terrors on Horseback (1946) - story, screenplay
The Mysterious Mr. Valentine (1946) - original screenplay
Spoilers of the North (1947) - original screenplay
Web of Danger (1947) - original screenplay
Stage Struck (1948) - screenplay
Rocky (1948) - original story
Big Town Scandal (1948) - original screenplay
Mr. Reckless (1948) - original screenplay
Speed to Spare (1948) - original screenplay
Dynamite (1949) - original screenplay
State Department File 649 (1949) - original story, screenplay
The Lawton Story (1949) - screenplay
Special Agent (1949) - concept
A Modern Marriage (1950) - screenplay
Southside 1-1000 (1950) - story
Western Pacific Agent (1950) - story
Street Bandits (1951) - screenplay
Old Oklahoma Plains (1952) - screenplay
Topeka (1953) - writer
The Homesteaders (1953) - writer
Old Overland Trail (1953) - writer
Frigid Wife (1962) - screenplay from A Modern Marriage''

References

American screenwriters
1903 births
1982 deaths
20th-century American screenwriters
Emigrants from the Russian Empire to the United States